Kokkisota is a Finnish cooking program. It airs on MTV3. It is based on the British show Ready Steady Cook. The Finnish show premiered in 1999, hosted by Sikke Sumari. The show was revived in 2017, with Sumari returning as the host alongside a new cast of chefs.

Format
Two chefs cook and the best wins. The revival features a 10-minute challenge before the main challenge.

10 minute fast challenge
The main chefs have to cook a dish using only the ingredients provided. The winner is decided by the host and receives an advantage in the next challenge.

Main challenge
The chefs prepare any food they want with a €20 budget. Then they have to cook delicious dishes from the food supply. The winner is decided by the audience.

Chefs

Original 
Markus Maulavirta
Helena Puolakka
Jyrki Sukula
Harri Syrjänen
Antti Vaahtera
Hans Välimäki
Aki Wahlman

Reboot
Kari Aihinen
Pipsa Hurmerinta (2017 only)
Teemu Laurell
Antto Melasniemi (2017 only)
Serko Rantanen
Tommi Tuominen
Harri Syrjänen (2017–present)
Linnea Vihonen (2018–present)
Sirly Ylläsjärvi (2021–present)

Series overview

Original series

Revived series

1Vappu Pimiä replaced Sikke Sumari for most episodes, as Sumari underwent testing for COVID-19. Sumari later returned to host the rest of the season.

Episodes (revived version)

Season 1 (2017)

Season 2 (2017–2018)

Season 3 (2018–2019)

Season 4 (2019–2020)

Season 5 (2021)

References

External links
 

1990s cooking television series
Finnish reality television series
MTV3 original programming
2010s cooking television series
Finnish television series based on British television series
Finnish non-fiction television series